The C. Ledyard Blair House was a mansion on 2 East 70th Street, at the corner with Fifth Avenue, on the Upper East Side of Manhattan in New York City. It was constructed for banker C. Ledyard Blair and designed by Carrère & Hastings. The house was constructed from 1914 to 1917 and contained almost . It was sold and demolished in 1927 to make way for an apartment house.

Architecture 
The Beaux-Arts mansion, designed by Carrère & Hastings, was at 2 East 70th Street, at the southeastern corner with Fifth Avenue. The house overlooked the gardens of the Henry Clay Frick House at 1 East 70th Street, which had also been designed by Carrère & Hastings. It was built by Norcross Brothers at a projected cost of between $150,000 and $200,000. The Lord Electric Company received the electric contract, Norcross Brothers furnished most of the rooms, and C. Brainard was consulting engineer.

The facade was made of limestone. The second-story windows had iron balconies. When the house was completed, it had a grass planting strip on Fifth Avenue, with two plane trees. The New York Times described it in 1915 as "an excellent example of good architectural taste combined with the luxuries and comforts of a Fifth Avenue home."

History

The stretch of 70th Street between Fifth Avenue and Third Avenue, part of Lenox Hill, was relatively undeveloped until World War I. Henry Clay Frick's mansion at the northeast corner of 70th Street and Fifth Avenue spurred the development of similarly grand mansions on 70th Street.

An anonymous buyer acquired the Fiske mansion from Fiske's widow in May 1912 for $750,000. In September 1914, the buyer was reported as C. Ledyard Blair, a banker and Governor of the New York Stock Exchange. The design and general contracts were awarded in February 1915. The house was completed in 1917. During the mansion's short existence, the Blairs hosted a luncheon in 1919 to celebrate the marriage of C. Ledyard Blair's daughter, as well as another social event in 1920.

By 1925, Blair was meeting with real estate developer Anthony Campagna to sell his mansion. At the time, Fifth Avenue was quickly being developed with apartments. In January 1926, after just nine years, Blair sold the property to Campagna for $1.25 million. He tore down the house in late 1926 and early 1927, redeveloping the site with a new 11-story apartment building designed by Rosario Candela. The new apartment was completed in 1928. The building featured a maisonette with its own private entrance and address, 888 Fifth Avenue, later owned by Theodore J. Forstmann.

References

Further reading 
 

Upper East Side
Demolished buildings and structures in Manhattan
Fifth Avenue
Houses in Manhattan